Newbridge Learning Community is a Special Educational Needs School in Wigan for pupils who have emotional, behavioural or social difficulties (EBSD). The school was formed from the merger of Kingshill Special School and Highlea School and opened in October 2008. It has fewer than 100 pupils.

Special secondary schools in England
Special schools in the Metropolitan Borough of Wigan
Community schools in the Metropolitan Borough of Wigan
Educational institutions established in 2008
2008 establishments in England